Frank Dancevic and Peter Polansky were the defending champions, but Dancevic chose not to compete.
Polansky paired with Adil Shamasdin and they won the title, defeating Chase Buchanan and James McGee in the final 6–4, 6–2.

Seeds

Draw

References 
 Draw

2014 MD
Kentucky Bank Tennis Championships - Men's Doubles